Kwasi Etu-Bonde is a Ghanaian politician and member of the Seventh Parliament of the Fourth Republic of Ghana representing the Kintampo North Constituency in the Bono East Region on the ticket of the National Democratic Congress. In 2019, he was ranked the 2nd Best Performing Member of Parliament in the Bono East Region.

Early life 
Etu-Bonde was born in Vume in the Volta Region of Ghana.

Education 

Etu-Bonde studied at the GIMPA (SME, Development and Management) where he received an EMBA in 2004.

Career 

Etu-Bonde is an entrepreneur and CEO of SKY-3 Investments Limited and Sustenance Agro Ventures located in Kintampo. He is a law maker and an agriculturist.

Politics 
In 2015 he contested and won the NDC parliamentary primaries for Kintampo North constituency in the Bono East Region of Ghana. He won this parliamentary seat during the 2016 Ghanaian general elections. He won with 22,407 votes making 53.89% of the total votes cast whilst the NPP parliamentary candidate Nkangmah Mateerl Charles had 17,610 votes making 42.36% of the total votes cast. He was succeeded by Joseph Kwame Kumah during the National Democratic Congress primaries in the Kintampo North Constituency after he declined to contest.

Personal life 
Etu-Bonde is married with five children.

Religion 
Etu-Bonde is a Christian.

References

Ghanaian MPs 2017–2021
1968 births
Living people
National Democratic Congress (Ghana) politicians